In mathematics, Levinson's inequality  is the following inequality, due to Norman Levinson, involving positive numbers.  Let  and let  be a given function having a third derivative on the range , and such that 

 

for all . Then 

 

The Ky Fan inequality is the special case of Levinson's inequality, where

References 
Scott Lawrence and Daniel Segalman: A generalization of two inequalities involving means, Proceedings of the American Mathematical Society. Vol 35 No. 1, September 1972.
Norman Levinson: Generalization of an inequality of Ky Fan, Journal of Mathematical Analysis and Applications. Vol 8 (1964), 133–134.

Inequalities